Frederick "Fred" Agius (born 2 February 1984) is an Australian footballer who plays for South Australian Amateur Soccer League team Brahma Lodge. In 2003, he played Australian rules football for Central District in the South Australian National Football League (SANFL) reserve grade, making him one of few people to play at semi-professional level in both football and Australian rules.

Football career
Between 1998 and 2000 Agius played underage football for the South Australian Sport Institute in the SAPL Under 23 division. Agius in 2001 was selected in the Australian team that played in the 2001 FIFA U-17 World Championship. Agius played four matches, scoring one goal. In a warm-up match prior to the tournament Agius scored six goals in a match against American Samoa.

In 2001 Agius moved to Playford City before moving to Sydney Olympic FC for the 2001/02 season of the National Soccer League. At Olympic he managed four appearances as a substitute.

At the beginning of the 2003/04 NSL season Agius moved back to the round ball game and to the new Adelaide United team set up in the wake of the withdrawal of Adelaide City from the competition. In the 2003/04 season he managed 13 appearances, scoring one goal. At the completion of the 2003/04 NSL season Agius returned to Adelaide City.

In November 2008 A-League expansion team North Queensland Fury enquired as to Agius' availability to which Adelaide City set a transfer fee of A$20,000. In December 2008 North Queensland Fury unveiled Agius as their latest signing. He is contracted for the 2009–2010 A-League season.

Australian rules career
After the 2001/02 NSL season Agius decided to try his hand at Australian rules football, a sport he had played as a junior. Joining Central District he was able to hold a spot in the reserve grade team and won a premiership medal as a member of the victorious grand final team.

References

External links

 North Queensland Fury profile 

1984 births
Living people
Australian soccer players
Australia youth international soccer players
Indigenous Australian soccer players
National Soccer League (Australia) players
Adelaide City FC players
Adelaide United FC players
Northern Fury FC players
Sydney Olympic FC players
Footballers who switched code
Indigenous Australian players of Australian rules football
Central District Football Club players
Expatriate footballers in Indonesia
A-League Men players
FFSA Super League players
Australian rules footballers from South Australia
Association football midfielders